Randall Weber (born September 2, 1968, in Fort St. John, British Columbia) is a retired ice hockey centre. He moved to Nottingham in the late 1970s and made his debut for the Nottingham Panthers at the age of seventeen in 1985. He would play for the Panthers for his entire professional career, breaking the club record for number of appearances and becoming the club's longest serving player. His 845 appearances is over 200 more than second placed Chick Zamick. His number 10 jersey was retired by the Panthers following his retirement in 2002.

Career statistics

Footnotes

References
Panthers History
Euro Hockey

External links
Randall Weber's career stats

1968 births
Canadian ice hockey centres
Ice hockey people from British Columbia
Living people
Nottingham Panthers players
People from Fort St. John, British Columbia
Canadian expatriate ice hockey players in England